On April 19–21, 1920, a multi-day severe weather event affected the Southeastern United States. The most intense portion of the outbreak occurred on the morning of April 20. At least seven tornadoes affected the American U.S. states of Mississippi, Alabama, and Tennessee, six of them rated violent F4s on the Fujita scale. The tornado outbreak killed at least 243 people.

Along its path, the tornado destroyed entire communities and killed at least 44 people in Alabama, becoming the state's deadliest tornado until March 21, 1932, when another F4 tornado killed 49 people. An EF5 tornado on April 27, 2011, is currently the state's deadliest on record, with 72 fatalities.

In addition to the tornadoes on April 20, other tornadoes associated with the same weather system occurred on April 19 and April 21.

Background
Toward the end of the period from April 10–20, 1920, a broad trough extended from the Rocky Mountains to the Great Plains, producing inclement weather. At 7:00 a.m. EST (13:00 UTC) on April 20, observations from local stations indicated a low-pressure area of at most  over the Lower Mississippi River near Memphis, Tennessee. A counterclockwise circulation was evident on the daily weather maps, with a trailing cold front approaching Mississippi from the west. An influx of warm, moist air from the Gulf of Mexico yielded surface temperatures of 70° F or greater as far north as Nashville, with mid to upper 70s over the southern halves of Mississippi and Alabama. Conditions were described as being "cloudy and sultry", even during the preceding night, with little fluctuation in relative humidity. Due to a steep temperature gradient and low-level moisture, atmospheric instability was conducive for convective growth, with a convergence zone providing sufficient wind shear for supercells. Relatively colder air above the surface also invaded the warm sector, further heightening parameters for severe thunderstorms. Despite widespread cloud cover, high temperatures in Alabama attained 85 °F or higher at several stations, illustrating the richness of the unstable air mass.

Confirmed tornadoes

April 19 event

April 20 event

April 21 event

Starkville–Cedarbluff–Aberdeen, Mississippi/Bexar–Hackleburg–Phil Campbell–Spruce Pine–Waco–Mehama, Alabama

A destructive, long-lived tornado developed near Bradley, northeast of Sturgis in Oktibbeha County. The funnel rapidly began producing "devastating" damage as it passed northwest of Starkville, with seven dead. Moving northeast, the tornado killed 10 more people near Cedarbluff in Clay County, leveling many homes. Thereafter, the tornado entered Monroe County and proceeded to ravage the western part of Aberdeen. 22 people died there, though it was the only sizable town in the path. In all, the tornado flattened more than 200 homes, mostly small, in Mississippi.

In Alabama, it leveled entire farms south of Bexar, with nine deaths. One farm alone reported 500 hogs killed. In Marion County alone, the  tornado killed 20 people and injured about 200, leveling 87 homes and damaging 100, especially in the Hackleburg area. In Franklin County, the tornado continued to destroy homes near Phil Campbell and Spruce Pine, but most of the deaths were near the Waco quarry, east of Russellville, where small homes were said to have been "wiped out" and swept away. 19 people died in and near the quarry, nine of whom were part of a family.

Continuing into southeast Colbert County, the tornado flattened the Mehama community south of Leighton. There, four people died, many homes were destroyed, and numerous cattle were killed; notably, a Ford vehicle, hurled some distance, was stripped of its wheel casings. One other home was destroyed nearby at Wolf Springs. Southeast of Town Creek, the tornado killed one more person before losing detection near the Tennessee River; the termination of its path is unknown and may have been in Limestone County, Alabama, or southern Tennessee. Pronounced darkness occurred at several locations in the path of the storm; one observer near Waco noted that there was no daylight and conditions were "dark as midnight."

See also
List of North American tornadoes and tornado outbreaks
2011 Hackleburg–Phil Campbell tornado

Notes

References

Sources

F4 tornadoes by date
Tornadoes of 1920
Tornadoes in Mississippi
Tornadoes in Alabama
1920 natural disasters in the United States
1920 in Alabama
1920 in Mississippi
Tornado outbreak